William Lane (1861–1917) was a journalist and pioneer of the Australian labour movement.

William Lane may also refer to:

Politicians
William Lane (died c. 1438), Member of Parliament (MP) for Canterbury
William Lane (fl. 1571), MP for Northampton
William Lane (died 1618) (1553–1618), MP for Northamptonshire and Gatton
William J. Lane (1905–1976), Pennsylvania politician
William Lane-Mitchell (1861–1940), British Conservative Party politician
William Preston Lane Jr. (1892–1967), Governor of Maryland
William Carr Lane (1789–1863), doctor and first mayor of St. Louis
William John Lane (1849–?), British Member of Parliament for East Cork, 1885–1892

Others
William Lane (bookseller) (1746–1814), London bookseller
William Lane (cricketer) (1845–1939), English banker, magistrate and cricketer
William Lane (priest), a Canon of Windsor from 1403 to 1404
W. L. Lane (fl. 1910s), secretary manager of the English football club Darlington
William L. Lane (1931–1999), American New Testament theologian and professor of biblical studies
William Lane Craig (born 1949), American analytic philosopher, philosophical theologian, and Christian apologist
Sir William Arbuthnot Lane, 1st Baronet (1856–1943), British surgeon and physician
William Lane (horn player), American French horn player and long-time Principal Horn of the Los Angeles Philharmonic
William Coolidge Lane (1859–1931), American librarian and historian
Master Juba (c. 1825–1852/3), stage name of dancer and minstrel performer William Henry Lane
Billy Lane (born 1970), motorcycle manufacturer
Bill Lane (disambiguation), multiple people